Aleksander Reinson (29 May 1890 Tartu – 13 October 1975) was an Estonian politician. He was a member of II Riigikogu, representing the Workers' United Front. He was a member of the Riigikogu since 18 February 1924. He replaced Rudolf Veiram. On 8 March 1924, he resigned his position and he was replaced by Jaan Tagel.

References

1890 births
1975 deaths
Politicians from Tartu
People from Kreis Dorpat
Workers' United Front politicians
Members of the Riigikogu, 1923–1926